The Journal of Cheminformatics is a peer-reviewed open access scientific journal that covers cheminformatics and molecular modelling. It was established in 2009 with David Wild (Indiana University) and Christoph Steinbeck (then at EMBL-EBI) as founding editors-in-chief, and was originally published by Chemistry Central. At the end of 2015, the Chemistry Central brand was retired and its titles, including Journal of Cheminformatics, were merged with the SpringerOpen portfolio of open access journals.

, the editors-in-chief are Rajarshi Guha (National Center for Advancing Translational Sciences) and Egon Willighagen (Maastricht University). The journal has issued a few special issues ("article collections") in 2011 and 2012, covering topics like PubChem3D, the Resource Description Framework, and the International Chemical Identifier.

In June 2021 Willighagen announced his intention to step down at the end of the year, explaining in an open letter that the publisher Springer Nature was not sufficiently FAIR and open. Barbara Zdrazil started as editor in chief in 2022.

Abstracting and indexing
The journal is abstracted and indexed in:
Chemical Abstracts Service
Current Contents/Physical, Chemical & Earth Sciences
Science Citation Index Expanded
Scopus
According to the Journal Citation Reports, the journal has a 2021 impact factor of 8.489. The most cited paper is on a cross-platform molecule editor and visualizer called Avogadro, which has been cited more than 3200 times as of September 2021 according to the Web of Science.

References

External links

Computer science journals
Cheminformatics
Creative Commons Attribution-licensed journals
Chemistry journals
Publications established in 2009
English-language journals